Holly Harris (born 2 November 2002) is an Australian figure skater who currently competes in ice dance. With her skating partner, Jason Chan, she is the 2019 Australian national champion.

As a singles skater, she qualified to the final segment at the 2017 World Junior Championships and finished 23rd overall. She is the 2016 Volvo Open Cup junior silver medalist and the 2016 Australian junior national champion.

Career

Singles career 
After winning the Australian novice title for two consecutive seasons, Harris made her international competitive debut in the 2016–17 season, beginning on the Junior Grand Prix, where she placed eleventh at the JGP Germany.  Next winning the Australian junior national title, she was assigned to compete at the 2017 World Junior Championships, where she qualified for the free skate and placed twenty-third overall.  She described it as "an amazing experience" and anticipated training for the following season, but it would be her last international competition as a singles skater.

Harris afterwards suffered multiple concussions that she described as making her "a little bit afraid to hit my head again." She opted instead to switch to ice dance.

2019–20 season: Debut of Harris/Chan 
Harris subsequently formed a dance partnership with Canadian ice dancer Jason Chan and began training at the Ice Academy of Montreal under coaches Marie-France Dubreuil, Patrice Lauzon, and Romain Haguenauer.

Harris/Chan debuted internationally on the Challenger series at the 2019 CS Warsaw Cup, where they placed ninth, in the process defeating reigning Australian national champions Kerry/Dodds (in eleventh place) by almost 25 points.  They went on to win the Australian national title.  Harris/Chan made their ISU Championship debut at the 2020 Four Continents Championships in Seoul, where they placed ninth.  They were assigned to compete at the World Championships in Montreal, but these were cancelled as a result of the coronavirus pandemic.

2020–21 season 
Harris/Chan were assigned to make their Grand Prix debut at the 2020 Skate Canada International, but this event was also cancelled as a result of the coronavirus pandemic. They made their World Championship debut at the 2021 World Championships in Stockholm, placing twenty-fourth.

2021–22 season 
Harris/Chan began the season at the Skating Club of Boston-hosted Lake Placid Ice Dance International, where they finished in fourth place. They then were assigned to the 2021 CS Nebelhorn Trophy, seeking to qualify a berth for Australia at the 2022 Winter Olympics. They finished in ninth place, making Australia the fourth reserve. Harris/Chan competed at two more Challenger events, finishing thirteenth at the 2021 CS Finlandia Trophy and seventh at the 2021 CS Golden Spin of Zagreb. They then won the bronze medal at the Santa Claus Cup.

Assigned to the 2022 Four Continents Championships in Tallinn, Harris/Chan finished in eighth place. The team concluded the season at the 2022 World Championships, held in Montpellier with Russian dance teams absent due to the International Skating Union banning all Russian athletes due to their country's invasion of Ukraine. Harris/Chan qualified to the free dance for the first time, coming in eighteenth place.

2022–23 season 
Appearing at the inaugural Britannia Cup, Harris/Chan won the bronze medal. They were seventh at the 2022 CS Nebelhorn Trophy. They were invited to make their Grand Prix debut at the 2022 Skate America, where they finished fourth in the rhythm dance and set a new personal best, clearing the 70-point mark for the first time. They finished fifth overall after errors in the free dance. The following weekend, they were eighth at the 2022 Skate Canada International, their second Grand Prix. After the Grand Prix, Harris/Chan won gold at the Santa Claus Cup and came seventh at the 2022 CS Golden Spin of Zagreb.

Harris/Chan finished eighth at the 2023 Four Continents Championships.

Programs

With Chan

Ladies' singles

Competitive highlights 
CS: Challenger Series; JGP: Junior Grand Prix

Ice dancing with Chan

Ladies' singles

References

External links 
 
 

2002 births
Living people
Australian female ice dancers
Australian female single skaters
Figure skaters from Sydney